Scoliosorus is a genus of ferns in the subfamily Vittarioideae of the family Pteridaceae with a single species, Scoliosorus ensiformis. The species is native to Mexico and Central America.

References

Pteridaceae
Monotypic fern genera